Fred Carter (13 January 1879 – 4 June 1941) was a British racewalker. He competed in the 10 miles walk at the 1908 Summer Olympics.

References

External links
 

1879 births
1941 deaths
British male racewalkers
Olympic athletes of Great Britain
Athletes (track and field) at the 1908 Summer Olympics